Leonardo Fabián Burián Castro (born 21 January 1984) is a Uruguayan professional footballer who plays as a goalkeeper for Argentine Primera División side Vélez Sarsfield. He was born in Montevideo.

External links
 
 

1984 births
Living people
Uruguayan footballers
Uruguay youth international footballers
Uruguayan expatriate footballers
Association football goalkeepers
Club Nacional de Football players
C.A. Bella Vista players
Juventud de Las Piedras players
Deportes Tolima footballers
Montevideo Wanderers F.C. players
Chiapas F.C. footballers
Godoy Cruz Antonio Tomba footballers
Club Atlético Colón footballers
Club Atlético Vélez Sarsfield footballers
Argentine Primera División players
Uruguayan Primera División players
Categoría Primera A players
Uruguayan expatriate sportspeople in Argentina
Uruguayan expatriate sportspeople in Colombia
Uruguayan expatriate sportspeople in Mexico
Expatriate footballers in Argentina
Expatriate footballers in Colombia
Expatriate footballers in Mexico
Uruguayan people of Czech descent